Achocalla (Hispanicized spelling) or Achuqalla (Aymara for weasel) is a location in the La Paz Department in Bolivia. It is the seat of the Achocalla Municipality, the third municipal section of the Pedro Domingo Murillo Province.

Climate
The Köppen Climate Classification subtype for this climate is "Cwc" (Oceanic Subtropical Highland Climate).

See also 
 Jach'a Quta
 1582 Ancuancu earthquake

External links
 Instituto Nacional de Estadistica de Bolivia

References 

Populated places in La Paz Department (Bolivia)